Escondida is the second studio album by American musician Jolie Holland, released on April 27, 2004, by Anti-. "Escondida" means "hidden" in Spanish and Portuguese.

Track listing 
All tracks written by Jolie Holland, except where noted.
 "Sascha" – 3:08
 "Black Stars" – 4:54
 "Old Fashioned Morphine" – 4:35
 "Amen" – 3:32
 "Mad Tom of Bedlam" (Traditional) – 2:52
 "Poor Girl's Blues" – 5:26
 "Goodbye California" – 3:28
 "Do You?" – 4:49
 "Darlin Ukulele" (Holland, Samantha Parton) - 4:07
 "Damn Shame" – 4:49
 "Tiny Idyll/Lil Missy" – 2:41
 "Faded Coat of Blue" (Traditional) – 3:47

Personnel 
 Jolie Holland – voice, guitar, piano, ukulele
 Dave Mihaly – drums, marimba, voice
 Brian Miller – electric guitar, acoustic guitar, voice
 Keith Cary – double bass, mandolin, banjo
 Ara Anderson – trumpet
 Enzo Garcia – musical saw
 Paul Scriver – soprano saxophone

References 

2004 albums
Jolie Holland albums